Dania Beach (Dania until 1998) is a city in Broward County, Florida, United States. As of the 2020 census, the city's population was 31,723. It is part of the South Florida metropolitan area, which was home to 5,564,635 people at the 2010 census. Dania Beach is the location of one of the largest jai alai frontons in the United States, The Casino at Dania Beach. It was formerly the location for two amusement centers; one named Boomers! (formerly Grand Prix Race-O-Rama), which housed the Dania Beach Hurricane roller coaster, and the other being Pirates World amusement park, which was featured in Barry Mahon's Thumbelina. It is also home to the International Game Fish Association Hall of Fame and Museum.

History
The area was started as a neighborhood called Modello in the late 19th century. In November 1904, the area was incorporated as the town of Dania, because most of the 35 residents were farmers of Danish ancestry.   On January 4, 1926, Dania voted to annex itself to the City of Hollywood.

After the September 1926 Miami hurricane decimated Hollywood's fortunes, most of Dania seceded from the City of Hollywood and reincorporated as a city. The areas that chose to remain part of the City of Hollywood caused Dania's current noncontinuous city boundaries. In November 1998, Dania formally changed its name to Dania Beach. The name Dania is still commonly used to refer to the city.

In 2001, the city annexed several unincorporated areas of Broward County, increasing its population by about 3,600 people.

Formerly known as the "Tomato Capital of the World", once the city went from a farming settlement to an urban city, it soon took on the name "Antique Capital of the South", due to many antique shops in downtown Dania Beach, especially along Federal Highway, known as the city's "Antique Row".

Geography

Dania Beach's boundaries are Fort Lauderdale to the north, Hollywood to the south, Hollywood and the Atlantic Ocean to the east, and Davie along with the Hollywood Seminole Indian Reservation to the west of the city.

Dania Beach is adjacent to Fort Lauderdale-Hollywood International Airport.

Demographics

2020 census

As of the 2020 United States census, there were 31,723 people, 12,237 households, and 7,429 families residing in the city.

2010 census

As of 2010, the city had15,671 households, of which 17.8% were vacant. In 2000, 21.4% had children under 18 living with them, 34.9% were married couples living together, 14.1% had a female householder with no husband present, and 46.0% were not families. About 35.0% of all households were made up of individuals, and 10.8% had someone living alone who was 65 or older. The average household size was 2.19, and the average family size was 2.85.

2000 census
In 2000, the age distribution was 20.0% under 18, 6.9% from 18 to 24, 31.9% from 25 to 44, 25.1% from 45 to 64, and 16.1% who were 65 or older. The median age was 40 years. For every 100 females, there were 99.6 males. For every 100 females 18 and over, there were 99.4 males.

In 2000, the median income for a household in the city was $34,125, and for a family was $37,405. Males had a median income of $35,081 versus $26,535 for females. The per capita income for the city was $20,795. About 14.6% of families and 18.3% of the population were below the poverty line, including 31.6% of those under age 18 and 16.0% of those age 65 or over.

As of 2000, English as a first language was spoken by 76.85%, while Spanish accounted for 12.38%, French at 4.88%, French Creole at 1.94%, Italian at 1.36%, and Arabic was spoken by 0.80% of the population.

As of 2000, Dania Beach had the 127th-highest percentage of Cuban residents in the US, at 1.69% of the city's population (tied with Fort Lauderdale and Parkland.)

Economy
The airline Sun Air International has its headquarters in Dania Beach.

American Maritime Officers is headquartered in Dania Beach, as is the Alec Bradley Cigar Co., a maker of hand-rolled cigars.

Carnival Air Lines was headquartered in Dania Beach. Gulfstream International Airlines was formerly headquartered in Dania Beach.

Chewy.com is headquartered in the town, as well.

Education
Dania Beach's public schools are operated by the Broward County Public Schools. Its public elementary schools include Collins Elementary School and Dania Elementary School. Olsen Middle School is a local public middle school, and South Broward High School serves the area from neighboring Hollywood, Florida.

During the segregation period, the first school for Black students met in the St. Ruth Missionary Baptist Church.

Media
Dania Beach is a part of the Miami-Fort Lauderdale-Hollywood media market, which is the 12th-largest radio market and the 17th largest television market in the United States. Its primary daily newspapers are the South Florida-Sun Sentinel and The Miami Herald, and their Spanish-language counterparts El Sentinel and El Nuevo Herald.

Transportation
Dania Beach is served by the Fort Lauderdale Airport station on the Tri-Rail. It is also served by several Broward County Transit buses.

References

External links

 City of Dania Beach official website

Cities in Broward County, Florida
Danish-American history
Populated coastal places in Florida on the Atlantic Ocean
Populated places established in 1898
Cities in Florida
Beaches of Broward County, Florida
Beaches of Florida